Victor Lawton Wainwright, Jr. (born February 4, 1981) is an American blues and boogie-woogie singer, songwriter, and pianist. Wainwright's musical style was described by the American Blues Scene magazine in 2013 as "honky-tonk and boogie, with a dose of rolling thunder. Wainwright's playing is simply beautiful madness."

Living Blues magazine noted that "Wainwright serves as an electrifying guide to a good time – spinning tales, telling his listeners how to beat the blues, and meticulously conjuring raw soul and energy out of his acoustic piano."

Wainwright currently tours both nationally and internationally, performing with two bands: Victor Wainwright and the Train, and Southern Hospitality. Wainwright formerly toured as Victor Wainwright & the WildRoots.

Early life and career
Wainwright was born in Savannah, Georgia, United States. Both his father and grandfather were blues musicians, and became Wainwright's early mentors. At the age of 10 at a family gathering, Wainwright played "Für Elise". Wainwright's own ensemble backed Eric Culberson at the Savannah Blues Bar, during the former's high school years.

Wainwright later attended college in Daytona Beach, Florida, and undertook an Air Traffic Management and Psychology degree at Embry–Riddle Aeronautical University, before relocating to Memphis, Tennessee. He then worked as an air traffic controller at Memphis International Airport.

In 2004, Wainwright met Florida native Stephen Dees in Ormond Beach, Florida. The latter was part of Novo Combo in the early 1980s. The meeting led to Dees co-writing and producing Wainwright's debut album, Piana from Savannah (2005). In 2008, Wainwright played alongside the Reverend Billy C. Wirtz on Wirtz's live album Pianist Envy – Group Therapy.

Victor Wainwright & the WildRoots
After the release of Piana from Savannah, Wainwright and Dees joined forces under the name of Victor Wainwright & the WildRoots. Wainwright and Dees shared vocal duties, with the former on keyboards and the latter on bass and guitar with Greg Gumpel as lead guitarist from 2002 through 2009. They were backed by Billy Dean (drums, backup vocal), Nick Black (guitar, backup vocal), Patricia Ann Dees, and Ray Guiser (tenor sax), and Charlie deChant (baritone sax). In September 2009, they released Beale Street to the Bayou on WildRoots Records. The album was praised by critics and placed on the Root Music Report "Top 50 Blues," the Blues Internet Charts, the Tennessee Roots Charts, and Europe's Collectif des Radio Blues Charts.

In October 2010, Wainwright appeared at Dark Season Blues in Norway. In 2011, he performed at the South Florida Boogie Woogie Piano Festival. In June that year, Lit Up! was released, again credited to Victor Wainwright & the WildRoots. The album reached the number one spot on Sirius/XM's B.B. King's Bluesville channel's "Pick To Click," number 2 on the Collectif des Radio Blues Charts, and number 13 on the Living Blues Radio Chart.

Wainwright also performed at Springing the Blues in Jacksonville Beach, Florida, plus at Memphis in May in 2012. The same year he was nominated for the first time for a Blues Music Award. In October 2014, he appeared at the Daytona Blues Festival.

In July 2015, Victor Wainwright & the WildRoots released Boom Town on Blind Pig Records.

Southern Hospitality
Following an impromptu jam session in July 2011 in Florida, Wainwright teamed up with Damon Fowler, J.P. Soars, Chuck Riley, and Chris Peet to form the band that would eventually become Southern Hospitality. Their first gig was supporting Buddy Guy in August the same year at the Heritage Music Blues Fest in Wheeling, West Virginia. Their debut album, Easy Livin' , (2013) was produced by Tab Benoit, and released by Blind Pig Records. It peaked at number 9 on the US Billboard Top Blues Album chart. In 2014, Wainwright won the 'Pinetop Perkins Piano Player of the Year' award at the Blues Music Awards for the second consecutive year.

Wainwright currently lives in Savannah, Georgia, having relocated from Memphis in 2022.

Victor Wainwright and The Train 

Wainwright teamed up with friend, engineer, and producer Dave Gross in 2017 to form "The Train," to begin work on what would become the 2018 Grammy nominated self-titled album, Victor Wainwright and The Train. For touring and recording, Wainwright kept longtime bandmates Billy Dean on drums and Terrence Grayson on bass. For guitar, Wainwright added Pat Harrington. He also added the horn players Doug Woolverton and Mark Earley from Roomful of Blues. Wainwright wrote all 12 original songs.

The album, Victor Wainwright and The Train, was recorded at the Ardent Studios in Memphis, Tennessee. The album, co-produced by Wainwright and Gross, was released on March 9, 2018. It went on to garner a Grammy Award nomination for Best Contemporary Blues Album of the Year.

Wainwright currently tours with The Train, consisting of the same recording artists as on the album.

Honors
 2020: Blues Music Award Winner for Instrumentalist - Piano (Pinetop Perkins Piano Player)
2018: Grammy Award Nominee (Best Contemporary Blues Album)
 2018: No. 1 Most played contemporary blues album of the year
 2018: No. 2 Most played blues album of the year
 2018: No. 1 Billboard Blues Albums Chart
 2018: Blues Music Award Winner for the Pinetop Perkins Piano Player of the Year
 2017: Blues Music Award Winner for the Pinetop Perkins Piano Player of the Year
 2016: Blues Music Award Winner for the B.B. King Entertainer of the Year
 2016: Band of the Year
 2016: Blues Blast Award Winner for Contemporary Album of the Year

Discography

See also
List of electric blues musicians

References

External links
Official website
Victor Wainwright & the WildRoots official website
Blind Pig Records official website
YouTube video
July 2014 interview

1981 births
Living people
American blues singers
American blues pianists
American male pianists
American rhythm and blues keyboardists
Songwriters from Georgia (U.S. state)
Musicians from Savannah, Georgia
Air traffic controllers
21st-century American male singers
21st-century American singers
21st-century American pianists
Blind Pig Records artists
American male songwriters